Daria Vladimirovna Mishina (née Mironova, born 9 April 1993) is an inactive Russian tennis player.

She has career-high WTA rankings of 319 in singles and 270 in doubles.

Mishina made her WTA Tour main-draw debut at the 2019 St. Petersburg Trophy, in the doubles tournament, partnering Ekaterina Shalimova.

ITF Circuit finals

Singles: 12 (7 titles, 5 runner–ups)

Doubles: 16 (11 titles, 5 runner–ups)

References

External links
 
 

1993 births
Living people
Russian female tennis players
20th-century Russian women
21st-century Russian women